Johan Vestly (November 24, 1923 – November 28, 1993) was a Norwegian illustrator, artist and film producer.

Johan Vestly  was born in Oslo, Norway. After taking his secondary education in 1943, he studied at the Norwegian National Academy of Craft and Art Industry as well as privately. He also stayed in Paris in 1949. Originally a painter, Vestly was represented at the Norwegian Autumn Exhibition in 1947.

Johan Vestly illustrated his first book in 1953, and later illustrated most of the books of his wife, Anne-Cath. Vestly. Together with his wife, Johan Vestly twice received the Illustrasjonsprisen awarded by the Norwegian National Library Authority  (Statens bibliotektilsyn). In 1964, the husband and wife team was honored for Knerten gifter seg and in 1976 for Guro og nøkkerosene.

Vestly also worked as a television producer on  several programs including the television series Guro and  directed a documentary on Norwegian skier pioneer, Sondre Nordheim. Norway's stamps for the 2010 Europa issue under the joint theme of children's books featured illustrates by Johan Vestly. The stamps featured Mormor og de åtte ungene (Grandma and the Eight Children) from the seven books series written by Anne-Cath. Vestly.

References

1923 births
1993 deaths
20th-century Norwegian painters
Norwegian male painters
Norwegian illustrators
Artists from Oslo
Oslo National Academy of the Arts alumni
20th-century Norwegian male artists